Ramon Berenguer IV (c. 1114 – 6 August 1162, Anglicized Raymond Berengar IV), sometimes called the Saint, was the count of Barcelona who brought about the union of the County of Barcelona with the Kingdom of Aragon to form the Crown of Aragon.

Early reign
Ramon Berenguer was born 1114, the son of Count Ramon Berenguer III of Barcelona and Countess Douce I of Provence. He inherited the county of Barcelona from his father Ramon Berenguer III on 19 August 1131. On 11 August 1137, at the age of about 24, he was betrothed to the infant Petronilla of Aragon, aged one at the time. Petronilla's father, King Ramiro II of Aragon, who sought Barcelona's aid against King Alfonso VII of Leon, withdrew from public life on 13 November 1137, leaving his kingdom to Petronilla and Ramon Berenguer, the latter in effect becoming ruler of Aragon, although he was never king himself, instead commonly using the titles "Count of the Barcelonans and Prince of the Aragonians" (Comes Barcinonensis et Princeps Aragonensis), and occasionally those of "Marquis of Lleida and Tortosa" (after conquering these cities).

The treaty between Ramon Berenguer and his father-in-law, Ramiro II, stipulated that their descendants would rule jointly over both realms, and that even if Petronilla died before the marriage could be consummated, Ramon Berenguer's heirs would still inherit the Kingdom of Aragon. Both realms would preserve their laws, institutions and autonomy, remaining legally distinct but federated in a dynastic union under one ruling house. Historians consider this arrangement the political masterstroke of the Hispanic Middle Ages. Both realms gained greater strength and security and Aragon got its much needed outlet to the sea. On the other hand, formation of a new political entity in the north-east at the time when Portugal seceded from León in the west gave more balance to the Christian kingdoms of the peninsula. Ramon Berenguer successfully pulled Aragon out of its pledged submission to Castile, aided no doubt by his sister Berengaria, wife of Alfonso VII, who was well known in her time for her beauty and charm.

Crusades and wars
In the middle years of his rule, Ramon Berenguer turned his attention to campaigns against the Moors. In October 1147, as part of the Second Crusade, he helped Castile to conquer Almería. He then invaded the lands of the Almoravid taifa kingdoms of Valencia and Murcia. In December 1148, he captured Tortosa after a six-month siege with the help of Southern French, Anglo-Norman and Genoese crusaders. When Moors later tried to recapture Tortosa, the women put up such a spirited defense that Ramon Berenger created for them the Order of the Hatchet. The next year, Fraga, Lleida and Mequinenza in the confluence of the Segre and Ebro rivers fell to his army.

Ramon Berenguer also campaigned in Provence, helping his brother Berenguer Ramon and his infant nephew Ramon Berenguer II against the counts of Toulouse. During the minority of Ramon Berenguer II, the count of Barcelona also acted as the regent of Provence (between 1144 and 1157). In 1151, Ramon signed the Treaty of Tudilén with Alfonso VII of León and Castile. The treaty defined the zones of conquest in Andalusia as an attempt to prevent the two rulers from coming into conflict. Also in 1151, Ramon Berenguer founded and endowed the royal monastery of Poblet. In 1154, he accepted the regency of Gaston V of Béarn in return for the Bearnese nobles rendering him homage at Canfranc, thus uniting that small principality with the growing Aragonese state.

Marriage and children
Ramon and Petronilla had:
Infante Peter
Alfonso II of Aragon
Ramon Berenguer III, Count of Provence
Dulce, Queen of Portugal
Sancho, Count of Provence

Death
Ramon Berenguer IV died on 6 August 1162 in Borgo San Dalmazzo, Piedmont, Italy. He was succeeded by his eldest surviving son, Ramon Berenguer, who also inherited the Kingdom of Aragon upon Petronilla's abdication in 1164. He changed his name to Alfonso as a nod to his Aragonese lineage, and became Alfonso II of Aragon. Ramon Berenguer IV's younger son Pere (Peter) inherited the county of Cerdanya and lands north of the Pyrenees, and changed his name to Ramon Berenguer.

Appearance and character
The Chronicle of San Juan de la Peña said he was, "[a] man of particularly great nobility, prudence, and probity, of lively temperament, high counsel, great bravery, and steady intellect, who displayed great temperance in all his actions. He was handsome in appearance, with a large body and very well-proportioned limbs."

References

Bibliography

Villegas-Aristizabal, Lucas (2009),  "Anglo-Norman involvement in the conquest of Tortosa and Settlement of Tortosa, 1148-1180", Crusades 8, pp. 63–129.

1110s births
1162 deaths
Counts of Barcelona
Spanish princes
Christians of the Second Crusade
Burials at Santa Maria de Ripoll
Ramon 4
12th-century people from the County of Barcelona